Modern Television is a British production company based in Cardiff and London. It was founded in 2005 by Griff Rhys Jones and Simon Mansfield, who left in 2011. Since 2011 the Managing Director has been Sarah Broughton.  Tom Hollander was cast to play Dylan Thomas in the companies first drama production, A Poet in New York  with Griff Rhys Jones acting as executive producer on the feature-length drama directed by Aisling Walsh
Awards: The company won a Fast Growth 50 Award in 2009 and again in 2010. In 2012 it was listed in Televisual magazine as one of the top 100 production companies in the United Kingdom. 
A Great Welsh Adventure with Griff Rhys Jones won 'Best Presenter' at the BAFTA Cymru Awards 2014.
A Poet in New York won 'Best Actor' for Tom Hollander at the RTS Awards 2015 as well as 'Best Feature’ and 'Best Special and Visual Effects’ at the BAFTA Cymru Awards 2015.
The drama was also nominated for ‘Best Drama’ at the Broadcast Press Guild Awards, BAFTAs, Broadcast Awards, Celtic Media Awards and Critics’ Choice Television Awards in America in 2015.

Productions 
 Hidden Killers of the Post War Home
 Griff's Great Britain
 The Quizeum - 2 series
 A Great Welsh Adventure with Griff Rhys Jones
 Hidden Killers of the Tudor Home 
 National Treasures of Wales with Griff Rhys Jones 
 A Poet in New York
 A Great Welsh Adventure with Griff Rhys Jones
 New Hidden Killers: The Victorian Home
 New HIdden Killers: The Edwardian Home
 Burma, my Father and the Forgotten Army
 Hidden Killers of the Victorian Home
 Britain's Lost Routes with Griff Rhys Jones
 Hidden Treasures
 Rivers with Griff Rhys Jones
 Wilfred Owen: A Remembrance Tale
 Ian Fleming: Where Bond Began
 Greatest Cities of the World
 The Wind in the Willows with Griff Rhys Jones
 Charles Dickens and the Invention of Christmas
 The Prince's Welsh Village
 Terry Jones' Great Map Mystery
 Losing It
 A Pembrokeshire Farm
 Return to Pembrokeshire Farm
 The Heart of Thomas Hardy
 Monte Carlo or Bust
 Rudyard Kipling: A Remembrance Tale
 Why Poetry Matters
 Building Britain

References 

Performing arts in London
Television production companies of the United Kingdom
Entertainment companies established in 2005
Mass media companies established in 2005
2005 establishments in the United Kingdom